This is a list of photographers who were born in France or whose works are closely associated with that country.

A 
 Olympe Aguado
 Jacques Alexandre (born 1944)
 Georges-Louis Arlaud (1869–1944)
 Hippolyte Arnoux
 Yann Arthus-Bertrand
 Eugène Atget (1857–1927)
 Alan Aubry

B 
 Edouard Baldus
 Bruno Barbey (1941–2020)
 Jean Baudrillard
 Hippolyte Bayard (1807–1887)
 Alfred Beau (1829–1907)
 Christophe Beauregard (born 1966)
 Laurent Benaïm (born 1965)
 Laurent Biancani
 Auguste-Rosalie Bisson
 Louis Désiré Blanquart-Evrard
 Félix Bonfils
 Edouard Boubat
 Alexandra Boulat (1962–2007), photographer
 Jacques Bourboulon
 Mohamed Bourouissa (born 1978)
 Jean-Christian Bourcart
 Guy Bourdin
 Adeline Boutain (1862–1946), photographer, postcard publisher
 Bruno Braquehais
 Brassaï (1899–1984), Hungarian-born French photographer
 Adolphe Braun (1812–1877)
 Serge Brunier
 Jean-Marc Bustamante

C 
 Bernard Cahier
 Claude Cahun
 Sophie Calle (born 1953), photographer and other media
 Henri Cartier-Bresson (1908–2004)
 Jean Chamoux
 Jean-Philippe Charbonnier
 Désiré Charnay
 Germaine Chaumel (1895–1982) 
 Clark and Pougnaud, art duo composed of photographer and painter
 Antoine Claudet
 Paul de Cordon

D 
 Louis-Jacques Daguerre (1787–1851)
 Luc Delahaye
 Édouard Delessert (1828–1898), painter, archaeologist and photographer
 Patrick Demarchelier
 Thomas Devaux (born 1980)
 André-Adolphe-Eugène Disdéri
 Louis-Camille d'Olivier
 Robert Doisneau (1912–1994), photographer
 Pierre Dubreuil (1872–1944), photographer
 Maxime Du Camp
 Louis Arthur Ducos du Hauron (1837–1920)
 Jean Louis Marie Eugène Durieu

E 
 Philippe Echaroux (born 1983)
 Wilfrid Esteve

F 
 Antoine Fauchery
 Bernard Faucon
 Flore (born 1963), French-Spanish photographer and daughter of the painter Olga Gimeno
 Hércules Florence
 Fernand Fonssagrives
 Vincent Fournier (born 1970), Burkina Faso-born Paris-based photographer
 Auguste François
 Jean-Baptiste Frénet (1814–1889)

G 
 Jules Gervais-Courtellemont
 Léon Gimpel
 Joseph-Philibert Girault de Prangey
 André Giroux
 Vincent Goutal (born 1971)
 Yohann Gozard (born 1977)
 Olivier Grunewald
 Emile Gsell

H 
 Lucien Hervé (1910–2007), Hungarian-born French photographer
 Henri Huet

I 
 Jules Itier

J 
 Gaspard-Pierre-Gustave Joly de Lotbinière
 Jean-François Jonvelle (born 1943)
 Valérie Jouve (born 1964), photographer, filmmaker

L 
 Eric Lafforgue
 Suzanne Lafont (born 1949), photographer, installation artist
 Frédéric Lagrange
 John Launois (1928–2002), photojournalist
 Jacques Henri Lartigue (1894–1986)
 Louis Legrand
 Gustave Le Gray
 Henri Le Secq
 Ange Leccia (born 1952), photographer, filmmaker
 Jean-François Lepage (born 1960), photographer
 Auguste and Louis Lumière
 Serge Lutens

M 
 Étienne-Jules Marey (1830–1904)
 Charles Marville (1816–1879)
 Pascal Meunier
 Jean-Baptiste Mondino
 Bruno de Monès (born 1952)
 Vincent Munier (born 1976)

N 
 Nadar (1820–1910)
 Joseph Nicéphore Niépce (1765–1833), inventor of photography

O 
 Dani Olivier (born 1969)
 André Ostier

P 
 Gilles Peress
 Pierre et Gilles, photography duo
 Jean Philippe Piter (born 1968)
 Michel Poivert (born 1965), photography historian, president of Société française de photographie
 Kate Polin (born 1967)
 Herman Puig, Cuban-born photographer and filmmaker
 Constant Puyo (1857–1933)

R 
 Réhahn
 Gérard Rancinan
 Henri-Victor Regnault
 Bettina Rheims (born 1952), photographer
 Marc Riboud (1923–2016), photographer
 Olivier Roller (born 1972)
 Dominique Roman (1824–1911)
 Willy Ronis (1910–2009), photographer
 Georges Rousse (born 1947), photographer

S 
 Lise Sarfati (born 1958), photographer
 Jean-Louis Schoellkopf (born 1946), photographer
 Stéphane Sednaoui
 Jeanloup Sieff
 Camille Silvy
 Hedi Slimane
 Albert Spaggiari
 Christine Spengler
 Alex Strohl (born 1989)

T 
 Chloé Tallot
 Antoine Tempé
 Jean-Baptiste Tournassoud (1866–1951), photographer and military officer
 Pierre Toutain-Dorbec (born 1951)
 Natalia Turine

V 
 Pierre de Vallombreuse (born 1962)
 Benedicte Van der Maar
 Xavier Veilhan (born 1963), photographer, other media
 Jean-Marie Villard (1828–1899)
 Jean-Michel Voge (born 1949)
 Franck Vogel

W 
 Evrard Wendenbaum
 Albert Willecomme (1900–1971) 
 Wols (1913–1951), German photographer who worked in France

Y 
 Muammer Yilmaz

See also
List of French women photographers
List of photographers

Photography in France
French
Photographers